Kentucky Route 14 (KY 14) is a  state highway in Kentucky that runs from U.S. Route 42 (US 42) and US 127 in rural Boone County to KY 177 in the unincorporated community of Morning View.

Route description

KY 14 begins heading toward the south and meets Interstate 71 before entering Verona. In Verona, KY 16 joins KY 14 and both head to the northeast. KY 14 and 16 meet Interstate 75 as the enter Walton. In downtown Walton, KY 14 meets US 25. KY 16 leaves KY 14 and heads north with US 25, while KY 14 heads south on US 25. KY 14 crosses into Kenton County before merging off of US 25 to the east in the unincorporated community of Bracht. KY 14 meets KY 17 in the unincorporated community of Piner before ending at KY 177 in the unincorporated community of Morning View on the Licking River

Major intersections

References

0014
Transportation in Boone County, Kentucky
Transportation in Kenton County, Kentucky